Damian Kabat (born 20 October 1989) is a Polish long-distance runner. In 2020, he competed in the men's race at the 2020 World Athletics Half Marathon Championships held in Gdynia, Poland.

References

External links 
 

Living people
1989 births
Place of birth missing (living people)
Polish male long-distance runners
Polish male marathon runners